The Zone is a compilation CD  by Enter Shikari. It was announced on 1 October 2007 by one of the members of Ambush Reality and was released on 12 November 2007. The compilation features b-sides, demos and a remix by Rou's side-project, Routron 5000.  The first few released have 2 hidden tracks, these were put on by mistake. Three tracks are from the BBC Radio 1 Zane Lowe Session performance.

There is also a limited run of The Zone with only four tracks on it.

Track listing

Track 1 is from the Sorry You're Not a Winner/OK Time for Plan B single.
Track 2 was featured on the Kerrang! Awards 2007 CD
Tracks 2 and 3 are b-sides from the Anything Can Happen in the Next Half Hour single.
Track 6 is the original download-only version.
Track 5 (live version) and 7 (b-side) are from the Jonny Sniper single.
Track 8 is the original free download version released through the Enter Shikari website in 2006, prior to Mothership.
Track 9 and 10 (Hidden Tracks) are live versions recorded at the same session as track 5.

Some downloaded copies featured the following tracklist:

The Feast (Demo Version) : 2:54
Kickin' Back on the Surface of Your Cheek : 3:39
Keep it On Ice : 2:55
Adieu (Routron 5000 Remix) : 7:24
Sorry You're Not A Winner (Zane Lowe BBC Session) : 4:25
Mothership (2006 Download Festival Version) : 4:51
Acid Nation : 3:14
Enter Shikari (Demo Version) : 2:54
Labyrinth : 3:58

References

External links

The Zone at YouTube (streamed copy where licensed)

Enter Shikari compilation albums
2007 compilation albums
Ambush Reality compilation albums